The 1982 Supercopa de España were two-legged Spanish football matches played on 13 October 1982 and 28 December 1982.

 League winners: Real Sociedad
 Cup winners: Real Madrid

Match details

First leg

Second leg

External links
 rsssf.com
 linguasport.com

Supercopa de Espana Final
Supercopa de Espana 1982
Supercopa de Espana 1982
Supercopa de España